Benue-Plateau State is a former administrative division of Nigeria. It was created on 27 May 1967 from parts of the Northern Region and existed until 3 February 1976, when it was divided into two states - Benue and Plateau. The city of Jos was the capital of Benue-Plateau State.

Benue-Plateau State Governors
Joseph Gomwalk (May 1967 – July 1975)
Abdullahi Mohammed (July 1975 – March 1976)

References

Former Nigerian administrative divisions
 States and territories established in 1967